Quint is a surname and a masculine given name. It may refer to:

Surname:
 Deron Quint (born 1976), American ice hockey player, formerly in the National Hockey League
 Jean-François Quint, French mathematician
 Michel Quint (born 1948), French writer
 Misha Quint (born 1960), Russian-born classical cellist and music director
 Olivier Quint (born 1971), French footballer and football coach
 Philippe Quint, Russian-American classical violinist
 Tracy Quint, American politician

Given name:
 Arthur Quentin Quint Davis (born 1947), American festival producer and director
 Quint Kessenich (born 1967), American sportscaster
 Pieter Philips Jurriaan Quint Ondaatje (1758-1818), Dutch politician

Fictional characters:
 Quint, a professional shark hunter in Peter Benchley's novel Jaws, as well as the film adaptation
 Quinton Chamberlain, in the American soap opera Guiding Light
 Quint (Mega Man), an evil robot in the Mega Man game series
 Quint, a shipwright in the series of novels Spider Riders
 Peter Quint, a principal character in the novel The Turn of the Screw

See also
 Catherine Guy-Quint, a French politician
 Charles V, Holy Roman Emperor (1500-1558), also known as Charles Quint, ruler of the Spanish Empire and the Holy Roman Empire

Masculine given names
French-language surnames